Mike Derks (born April 20, 1962) is a former Canadian Football League offensive lineman and Grey Cup champion. A native of Sudbury, Ontario, after playing for the Cincinnati Bearcats he joined the Hamilton Tiger-Cats for 6 seasons, winning the championship in 1986.

References

1962 births
Living people
Canadian football offensive linemen
Cincinnati Bearcats football players
Hamilton Tiger-Cats players
Players of Canadian football from Ontario
Sportspeople from Greater Sudbury
University of Cincinnati alumni